Timothy Edward Freyer (born October 13, 1963) is an American prelate of the Roman Catholic Church, serving as auxiliary bishop for the Diocese of Orange in California since 2017.

Biography

Early life 
Timothy Freyer was born on October 13, 1963, in Los Angeles and grew up in Huntington Beach, California. Freyer is the only child of Jerry and Patricia Freyer. After graduating from Huntington Beach High School, he entered the St. John's Seminary College in Camarillo, California, where he earned his bachelor degree, followed by four years as a graduate student studying theology.

Priesthood 
Freyer was ordained a priest on June 10, 1989 by Bishop Norman McFarland for the Diocese of Orange.  After his ordination, Freyer received several pastoral assignments in Southern California.  He was first assigned as associate pastor at St. Hedwig Parish in Los Alamitos,  then five years later to the same position at Our Lady of Fatima Parish in San Clemente. After five years in San Clemente, Freyer became associate pastor in 1999 at St. Catherine of Siena Parish in Laguna Beach where he remained for two years. In 2001, Freyer was appointed pastor of St. Mary's Parish in Fullerton, and then in 2003 was reassigned as pastor for St. Boniface Parish in Anaheim.

Freyer was named diocesan episcopal vicar for priests in 2012. He was named the first bishop's liaison to the Jovenes para Cristo (Young Adults for Christ) movement from 1998-2004, helping them to write their statutes and revise their plan of formation as well as assisting them as they opened chapters in California, Texas and Oregon.

Freyer served as a founding board member of the Anaheim Family Justice Center that assists victims of domestic violence. He served two terms as a member of the board of trustees for St. Jude Medical Center in Fullerton, California and served on the Community Benefits Committee that oversees the Medical Center's care-for-the-poor programs. Freyer is a police chaplain for the Anaheim Police Department. He also holds the rank of senior chaplain in the Military and Hospitallar Order of St. Lazarus of Jerusalem as a chaplain in the Order's Commandery of the West.

Auxiliary Bishop of Orange
On November 23, 2016, Pope Francis named Freyer as auxiliary bishop for the Diocese of Orange.  On January 17, 2017, Freyer was consecrated by Bishop Kevin Vann.

See also

 Catholic Church hierarchy
 Catholic Church in the United States
 Historical list of the Catholic bishops of the United States
 List of Catholic bishops of the United States
 Lists of patriarchs, archbishops, and bishops

References

1963 births
Living people
People from Huntington Beach, California
21st-century Roman Catholic bishops in the United States
Catholics from California
Bishops appointed by Pope Francis